The 2001 Alltel 200 was the second stock car race of the 2001 NASCAR Busch Series and the 19th iteration of the event. The race was held on Saturday, February 24, 2001, in Rockingham, North Carolina, at North Carolina Speedway, a  permanent high-banked racetrack. The race took the scheduled 197 laps to complete. At race's end, Todd Bodine of Buckshot Racing would successfully defend the field, pitting for four tires late in the race to complete a dominant performance for the day to win the race. The win was Bodine's 12th career NASCAR Busch Series win and his first of the season. To fill out the podium, Kevin Harvick of Richard Childress Racing and Greg Biffle of Roush Racing would finish second and third, respectively.

Background 

North Carolina Speedway was opened as a flat, one-mile oval on October 31, 1965. In 1969, the track was extensively reconfigured to a high-banked, D-shaped oval just over one mile in length. In 1997, North Carolina Motor Speedway merged with Penske Motorsports, and was renamed North Carolina Speedway. Shortly thereafter, the infield was reconfigured, and competition on the infield road course, mostly by the SCCA, was discontinued. Currently, the track is home to the Fast Track High Performance Driving School.

Entry list

Practice 
Originally, there were two planned practice sessions to occur, with both being held on Friday, February 23, with the first being held at 11:00 AM EST, and the second being held at 4:00 PM EST, with both sessions lasting for an hour. However, both sessions were cancelled to due rain.

Qualifying 
Qualifying was held on Friday, February 23, at 2:15 PM EST. Each driver would have two laps to set a fastest time; the fastest of the two would count as their official qualifying lap. Positions 1-36 would be decided on time, while positions 37-43 would be based on provisionals. Six spots are awarded by the use of provisionals based on owner's points. The seventh is awarded to a past champion who has not otherwise qualified for the race. If no past champ needs the provisional, the next team in the owner points will be awarded a provisional.

No drivers would fail to qualify.

Race results

References 

2001 NASCAR Busch Series
NASCAR races at Rockingham Speedway
February 2001 sports events in the United States
2001 in sports in North Carolina